Gerhard Petritsch (born 2 September 1940) is an Austrian former sport shooter who competed in the 1972 Summer Olympics, in the 1976 Summer Olympics, in the 1980 Summer Olympics and in the 1984 Summer Olympics. He won a bronze medal at the 1980 Summer Olympics.

References

1940 births
Living people
Austrian male sport shooters
ISSF pistol shooters
Olympic shooters of Austria
Shooters at the 1972 Summer Olympics
Shooters at the 1976 Summer Olympics
Shooters at the 1980 Summer Olympics
Shooters at the 1984 Summer Olympics
Olympic bronze medalists for Austria
Olympic medalists in shooting
Medalists at the 1980 Summer Olympics
20th-century Austrian people